Venkatapuram is a 2017 Indian Telugu-language crime thriller film claimed to be based on true events. The film stars Rahul Haridas and newcomer Mahima Makwana.

Cast 
 Rahul Haridas as Anand
 Mahima Makwana as Chaitra
 Ajay
 Jogi Naidu
 Ajay Ghosh as Police officer
 Y. Kasi Viswanath

Reception 

In its review, The Times of India concluded: "The movie makes for a good one time watch if you can wait until the end."

Soundtrack

References

External links 
 

Indian crime thriller films
Indian films based on actual events
2017 crime thriller films
2010s Telugu-language films
Films scored by Achu Rajamani